The 2015–16 Longwood Lancers men's basketball team represented Longwood University during the 2015–16 NCAA Division I men's basketball season. The team was led by head coach Jayson Gee, in his third season, and played their home games at Willett Hall in Farmville, Virginia as members of the Big South Conference. It was the program's fortieth season of NCAA competition. They finished the season 10–23, 5–13 in Big South play to finish in a four-way tie for eighth place. They defeated Radford in the first round of the Big South tournament to advance to the quarterfinals where they lost to High Point.

Last season
The 2014–15 Lancers finished the season 11–23, 5–13 in Big South play to finish in ninth place. They upset Presbyterian and regular season champion Charleston Southern to advance to the semifinals of the Big South tournament, where they lost to Winthrop.

Departures

Class of 2015 signees

Coaching changes 
On April 24, Jake Luhn was promoted to associate head coach. On June 17, Craig Carter was named an assistant coach at Cornell. On July 7, former Marshall standout Adam Williams was named his replacement. Two days later, former Georgia student manager Cody Anderson was named director of basketball operations.

Roster 
On October 9, Johnson and forward Jason Pimentel were suspended indefinitely, following their arrest on marijuana possession charges. On November 3, Geter was placed on a medical redshirt for the season due to a shoulder surgery. Three days later, Fisher was suspended for four games (including an exhibition game) for an unspecified violation of team rules. On December 2, the Longwood athletic department announced that Pimentel "will not return" to the team", while Johnson would return for the December 12 game against Richmond. On February 3, the Longwood student newspaper The Rotunda reported that Dorsey was redshirting for the season.

Schedule 

|-
!colspan=12 style="background:#0F1D41; color:#9EA2A3;"| Exhibition game

|-
!colspan=12 style="background:#0F1D41; color:#9EA2A3;"| Regular season

|-
!colspan=12 style="background:#0F1D41; color:#9EA2A3;"| Big South tournament

References

Longwood Lancers men's basketball seasons
Longwood
Longwood
Long